Lorraine Jeanette Day is an American author, former orthopedic trauma surgeon and Chief of Orthopedic Surgery at San Francisco General Hospital and promoter of alternative cancer treatments.

She first became controversial when she began advocating that patients be tested for AIDS prior to surgery. In the 2000s, she started to promote an alternative cancer treatment program, which has attracted criticism as being generally misleading and dangerous.

Life 

Day graduated from the University of California, San Francisco, School of Medicine in 1969 and trained in orthopedic surgery at two San Francisco hospitals. She  became an associate professor and vice chairman of the Department of Orthopedics at the University of California, San Francisco, School of Medicine and Chief of Orthopedic Surgery at San Francisco General Hospital. During the mid-1980s, she received considerable media attention related to public discussions of the risks of acquiring AIDS through exposure to the blood of AIDS patients during trauma surgery. One action that she proposed was wearing the airborne protection suit that is usually worn to protect vulnerable patients from a doctor's germs. She published a book, AIDS: What the Government Isn't Telling You, wherein she states that in 1989, she retired from surgery because of the allegedly excessive risk of acquiring AIDS.

Day remarried later to former California congressman William Dannemeyer.

Alternative cancer treatment 
As a promoter of alternative medicine she claims to have discovered the cause and cure of cancer, as a result of God showing her how to recover from her own cancer with a 10 step plan. According to her theory, all cancers are due to weakness of the immune system which must be cured by diet. "All diseases are caused by a combination of three factors: malnutrition, dehydration, and stress."

In 2004, she began marketing her "Cancer Doesn't Scare Me Anymore" videotape with an infomercial. Stephen Barrett of Quackwatch registered a complaint about the content of the infomercial, and subsequently reported that the video had been declared to be "misleading" by the National Advertising Division of the Council of Better Business Bureaus in December 2004.

Stephen Barrett wrote on Quackwatch, "In my opinion, her advice is untrustworthy and is particularly dangerous to people with cancer".

Political and religious opinions
Day has referred to the Holocaust as a lie, and she has indicated that she believes that Jewish people wish to "destroy all governments and all religions".

See also
List of ineffective cancer treatments

References

External links 
 
 Transcripts of news reports of Zündel hearing proceedings

Alternative cancer treatment advocates
American Holocaust deniers
American orthopedic surgeons
Living people
Pseudoscientific diet advocates
Women surgeons
1937 births